Weapons used in the world's martial arts can be classified either by type of weapon or by the martial arts school using them.

By weapon type

Melee weapons
List of melee weapons
Bladed weapons
Swords: see Types of swords
Knives
Daggers: see List of daggers
Axe
Sickle
Kama
War hammer
Polearms
Halberd
Spear
Guandao
War scythe
Blunt weapons
Clubs/Mace/Baton
Stick/Staff / Sjambok
Tonfa / (side handled) baton
Knuckleduster

Ranged weapons
List of ranged weapons
 Bow and arrow
 Crossbow
 Bullet-shooting crossbow
 Slingshot
 Slings
 Boomerang
 Blowgun
 Shuriken
 Chakram
 Firearm
 Taser
 Ballistic knife

Flexible weapons
 Chain weapons
 Whips
 Ropes
 Tabak-Toyok
 Slapjack
 Nunchaku

Defensive weapons
List of defensive weapons
 Pepper spray
 Armours
 Shields

By martial arts tradition
Eskrima
Kendo
Pencak Silat: Weapons of pencak silat
Kalarippayattu
Swordsmanship:
Chinese swordsmanship
Japanese swordsmanship
Korean swordsmanship
European swordsmanship

See also
List of premodern combat weapons
List of practice weapons

Martial arts
Martial arts
Weapons
Weapons